Matthew B. Davidson (born August 9, 1977) is a Canadian former ice hockey right winger. He played 56 games in the National Hockey League with the Columbus Blue Jackets between 2000 and 2003. The rest of his career, which lasted from 1997 to 2011, was spent in the American Hockey League and then in several European leagues.

Career
Davidson was drafted in the fourth round, 94th overall, by the Buffalo Sabres in the 1995 NHL Entry Draft. After playing four seasons with the Portland Winter Hawks of the Western Hockey League, Davidson made his professional debut with the Sabres' AHL affiliate, the Rochester Americans. He played three seasons with the Americans before the Sabres traded his rights to the Columbus Blue Jackets as part of a deal during the 2000 NHL Expansion Draft. Davidson played in 56 NHL games over three seasons with the Blue Jackets, scoring five goals and adding seven assists.

During the 2004–05 NHL lockout, Davidson went to Germany to join the DEG Metro Stars of the Deutsche Eishockey League. While the NHL resumed play in 2005–06, Davidson remained in Germany and played with the Sinupret Ice Tigers, before making the move to Finland for the 2006–07 season.

Matt Davidson signed a two-year contract (2007–08 and 2008–09) in Denmark for the Frederikshavn Whitehawks. He then spent two years in Sweden, and retired in 2011.

Career statistics

References

External links
 

1977 births
Living people
Buffalo Sabres draft picks
Canadian expatriate ice hockey players in Finland
Canadian expatriate ice hockey players in Germany
Canadian ice hockey right wingers
Columbus Blue Jackets players
DEG Metro Stars players
Frederikshavn White Hawks players
Ice hockey people from Manitoba
KalPa players
Lowell Lock Monsters players
Nürnberg Ice Tigers players
Portland Winterhawks players
Rochester Americans players
Sportspeople from Flin Flon
Syracuse Crunch players
Tingsryds AIF players